Valery Konsantinovich Belousov (December 17, 1948 – April 16, 2015) was a Russian professional ice hockey coach and player.

Playing career
Belousov began playing hockey on a local Novouralsk team Kedr in 1964. In 1967 he was transferred to Sputnik Nizhny Tagil ultimately making his way to Traktor Chelyabinsk, Ural's premier hockey team, in 1971. During his 418-game stint in Chelyabinsk Belousov advanced with his team to the 1973 USSR Cup finals and was a bronze medalist in 1977 as part of the squad. Despite being one of the top snipers of the Soviet Championship he had a modest career on the Soviet national team where he spent only 8 games scoring a single goal.

He spent 1982—1984 seasons in Oji Seishi Tomakomai of the Japan Ice Hockey League winning the Japanese championship twice. Belousov finished his career playing for Metallurg Magnitogorsk, then a de facto farm team of Traktor, retiring as a player in 1987.

Coaching career
Belousov returned to Chelyabinsk in 1987 as an assistant coach. He replaced Gennadi Tsygurov as the head coach in 1990 and eventually led the team to its first bronze medals since the late 70s. In 1995 he was invited back to Magnitogorsk as an assist coach to Valery Postnikov and then replaced him as the head coach in 1996. Helmed by Belousov Metallurg Magnitogorsk achieved its biggest success with two Russian Superleague championships and the 2000 IIHF Super Cup.

In the 2003-04 season he took over Avangard Omsk and headed the team to its first ever champion title winning in the finals over his former team Metallurg. A year later Belousov's Avangard also won the 2005 IIHF European Champions Cup. But after several not so stellar seasons Belousov was fired of his job along with his entire coaching stuff.

During the 2008—2010 seasons Belousov tried to recapture his success with Metallurg Magnitogorsk. But despite advancing to the 2008 Victoria Cup with New York Rangers and 2009 Champions Hockey League Finals with ZSC Lions Belousov's team lost both games.

In October 2010 he returned to Traktor Chelyabinsk for the first time in 15 years leading the team from the bottom of the season table to the 2013 Gagarin Cup Final.

He died on 16 April 2015.

Career statistics

Coaching record

References

External links
 
  Valery Belousov's bio at sports.ru

1948 births
2015 deaths
Honoured Coaches of Russia
Metallurg Magnitogorsk players
Oji Eagles players
People from Novouralsk
Russian ice hockey coaches
Russian ice hockey right wingers
Sputnik Nizhny Tagil players
Traktor Chelyabinsk players
Sportspeople from Sverdlovsk Oblast
Soviet ice hockey right wingers
Soviet expatriates in Japan